Kang Kuk-chol (born July 1, 1990) is a North Korean footballer who plays as a defender.

References

External links

 Kang Kuk-chol at Asian Games Incheon 2014
 
 
 

1990 births
Living people
North Korean footballers
North Korea international footballers
Footballers at the 2014 Asian Games
Asian Games medalists in football
Asian Games silver medalists for North Korea
Association football defenders
Medalists at the 2014 Asian Games
21st-century North Korean people